Mike Young is an American game designer, author, and founder of the first
independent professional LARP publishing house, "Interactivities Ink".

Works 
His works include co-authorship of Rules to Live By (RTLB), one of the few published generic (non-license not from tabletop) LARP system.
He has also published several LARPs and several card games.  He also
contributed many short pieces to the professional LARP journal
"Metagame" from 1989 through 1999.

His "The Galactic Emperor is Dead" LARP was sold to Skotos Inc
for their online game play.

Mike's "Tales From the Floating Vagabond 1" (1990), "Tales From the Floating Vagabond 2" 1992, and "Tales From the Floating Vagabond Square Root of Pi" (1997) were officially licensed LARPs run in the Tales from the Floating Vagabond RPG setting originally published by Avalon Hill. The first two were run with the creator of Tales from the Floating Vagabond, Lee Garvin.

He has also authored computer games (from Alien Software), including the Neophyte series.  He is credited on Legend Entertainment's "Callahan's Crosstime Saloon"  and "Blackstone Chronicles".  He is also credited as a level designer and developer for Icebreaker from Magnet Interactive Studios.

Mike has also published three card games, one of which, Hamlet: A Game In Five Acts, won an award in the Polycon Independent Game Design Contest.

In addition to designing games and LARP punditry, Mike current works for Biap Systems as a computer programmer.  Mike was the lead developer for "NBC Olympics Now," which was nominated for a 2007 Technology & Engineering Emmy Award from the National Television Academy in the category of "Outstanding Achievement in Advanced Media Technology for the Synchronous Enhancement of Original Television Content."

Mike has also had two entries published in the Bulwer-Lytton Fiction Contest.

His first work, Miskatonic Class Reunion
(1989) has been run over 20 times from 1989–2000 and has been
made available to others to run, but has not yet seen publication.  It has two sequels, "Miskatonic Archaeological Expedition" (1994), and "Miskatonic Class Reunion 2000" (2000).

References

Notes

External links 

Role-playing game designers
Board game designers
Place of birth missing (living people)
Year of birth missing (living people)
Live-action role-playing game designers
Living people
American game designers